Long In The Tooth is an EP by PIG (Raymond Watts) and Primitive Race released June 5, 2015 through Metropolis Records. The EP contains three new songs and various remixes by Army of the Universe, Mary Byker, Praga Kahn and more. It is the first release by the industrial supergroup Primitive Race. A remix of the title track that was unable to make the release due to technical problems was released through Primitive Race's official Facebook on April 1. The official music video for the song was posted on YouTube the following day.

Track listing

Credits
 Produced by: Raymond Watts, Erie Loch, Chris Kniker 
 Mixed by: Raymond Watts 
 Mastered by: Erie Loch 
 Art Concept: Chris Kniker
 Design & Layout: Erie Loch 
 Panorex: Jennifer Kniker

References

Pig (musical project) albums
Primitive Race albums
Metropolis Records albums